Goma Lambu (born 10 November 1984) is a Congolese footballer who plays as an attacking midfielder or right winger for Kingstonian.

Career
Lambu has played at Millwall and Mansfield Town and played for the England under-16 team. Following his release from Mansfield, Fisher Athletic, Tooting & Mitcham United, Southall, Hornchurch and Redbridge. In 2003, he had a trial at Chelsea.

At 21, he signed at the beginning of the 2006–07 season on a contract to keep him at Woking until the end of that season. On 6 June 2007, he signed another one-year contract which saw him at Woking until 2008. Lambu was released in 2009.

He joined Croydon Athletic following his release from Woking. Goma Lambu joined Kingstonian before the start of the 2012-13 season after another spell with Woking

References

External links

1984 births
Living people
Democratic Republic of the Congo footballers
Mansfield Town F.C. players
Fisher Athletic F.C. players
Hornchurch F.C. players
Kingstonian F.C. players
Redbridge F.C. players
Woking F.C. players
Croydon Athletic F.C. players
English Football League players
National League (English football) players
Tooting & Mitcham United F.C. players
Southall F.C. players
Association football midfielders
21st-century Democratic Republic of the Congo people